John Stuart-Wortley (8 April 1773 – 14 January 1797), British politician, was the eldest son of Col. James Archibald Stuart-Wortley.

As the eldest son, he replaced his father as Member of Parliament for the borough of Bossiney at the 1796 election. However, he died young, in January 1797, and his younger brother James Stuart-Wortley thereafter took his seat.

References

1773 births
1797 deaths
Members of the Parliament of Great Britain for constituencies in Cornwall
British MPs 1796–1800
John